RFP may refer to:
 25 metre rapid fire pistol, an ISSF Olympic shooting event
 Public Francophone Radios
 Radio fixed part, in digital enhanced cordless telecommunications
 Raffles Place MRT station, in Singapore (MRT station abbreviation)
 Raiatea Airport, in French Polynesia
 Red fluorescent protein
 Religions for Peace
 Request for production, in civil procedure
 Request for proposal
 Resolute Forest Products, a Canadian pulp and paper company
 Reversed field pinch
 Richmond, Fredericksburg and Potomac Railroad, a defunct American railroad
 Rock for People, a Czech music festival
 Russian Fascist Party